Joseph Lockard "Lock" Martin Jr. (October 12, 1916 – January 19, 1959) was an American performer afflicted with giantism. Martin and a twin brother were born in South Philadelphia, Pennsylvania; his brother died in childbirth. 

Martin would eventually grow to over 7 feet tall by adulthood, though his exact height was reported inconsistently. He became notable for appearing as the robot Gort in The Day the Earth Stood Still (1951). Despite his size, he had difficulty moving in the heavy robot suit, and during scenes in which he was supposed to lift and carry either Patricia Neal or Michael Rennie, they were either held up by wires, or replaced with lightweight dummies.

Martin traveled with Spike Jones and His City Slickers and appeared on their television show in the early 1950s. He also worked as a doorman at Grauman's Chinese Theater in Los Angeles. He can also be heard as a contestant on the 14th November 1951 edition of You Bet Your Life.

Towards the end of his career, he was filmed for a part in The Incredible Shrinking Man as a circus giant, but his scenes were deleted.

Filmography
Lost in a Harem (1944) – Bobo (as J. Lockard Martin)
Anchors Aweigh (1945) – Giant
Lady on a Train (1945) – Circus Club Doorman
The Day the Earth Stood Still (1951) – Gort
Four Star Revue (1952, TV Series) – Giant at Hollywood Bowl
Million Dollar Mermaid (1952) – Giant 
Off Limits (1953) – Big Sailor 
Invaders from Mars (1953) – Mutant carrying David to 'Intelligence' 
The Snow Creature (1954) – Yeti 
The Incredible Shrinking Man (1957) – Giant (scenes deleted)

References

External links

American male film actors
Male actors from Pennsylvania
People with gigantism
1916 births
1959 deaths
Burials at Forest Lawn Memorial Park (Hollywood Hills)
20th-century American male actors